The crested cuckoo-dove (Reinwardtoena crassirostris) is a species of bird in the family Columbidae. It is endemic to the Solomon Islands archipelago. Its natural habitats are subtropical or tropical moist lowland forest and subtropical or tropical moist montane forest. It is threatened by habitat loss.

Taxonomy and systematics 
The crested cuckoo-dove was originally described in 1859 as Turacoena crassirostris by John Gould on the basis of a specimen from Guadalcanal in the Solomon Islands. It was then moved to the monotypic genus Coryphoenas by Robert Wardlaw-Ramsay in 1890. The generic name Reinwardtoena is in honor of the naturalist Caspar Reinwardt, combining his name with the Ancient Greek word oinas, meaning pigeon. The specific name crassirostris is from the Latin words crassus, meaning thick, and rostris, meaning billed. Crested cuckoo-dove is the official common name designated by the International Ornithologists' Union. Other common names for the species include crested pigeon, crested cuckoo dove, and crested long-tailed pigeon.

The crested cuckoo-dove is one of three species in the genus Reinwardtoena. It does not have any subspecies.

Description 
Both sexes are similar in appearance. The upperparts and the flight feathers on the tail are black, while the breast, underparts, and hindneck is bluish-gray. The throat is white and the head and crest are pale purplish-gray. The feathers on the crown and nape have a hairy texture. The iris is yellow and surrounded by a ring of red orbital skin. The bill is orange-yellow, with a strongly hooked upper mandible, while the legs are red. Juveniles lack the crest, and are duller and duskier.

Vocalisations 
The advertising call is a far-carrying, whistling wha...whuaaw...wha...whuaaw, with the first note rising in pitch, and the second note being drawn-out and slurred.

Distribution and habitat 
The crested cuckoo-dove is endemic to the Solomon Islands archipelago, being found on the islands of Bougainville, Santa Isabel, Makira, Kolombangara, and Guadalcanal. It is thought to be nomadic.

Behaviour and ecology 
The crested-cuckoo dove occurs either alone or in pairs. It feeds on fruit, such as those from the genera Osmoxylon and Schefflera. It usually forages in trees, but occasionally comes down to the ground to feed. Eggs are laid in clutches of one.

Status 
The crested cuckoo-dove is listed as being near threatened by the International Union for Conservation of Nature (IUCN) on the IUCN Red List. Although its population has not been determined, it is believed to be moderately small, and declining due to habitat destruction and hunting. Populations in lowlands are declining faster than those in hilly areas, as the former face higher rates of logging. Recommended conservation actions include assessments of the species' population size, rate of population decline and habitat loss, and protection for areas that it inhabits, along with awareness programs to reduce hunting.

References 

crested cuckoo-dove
Endemic birds of the Solomon Islands
crested cuckoo-dove
Taxonomy articles created by Polbot